Krishna Savjani OBE SC (born 1947) is a prominent Malawi lawyer. He is the founder of Savjani and Company, Malawi’s leading law firm according to Chambers and Partners. He is also Senior Consul, an appointment made by the President of Malawi. Senior Counsel is the equivalent of Queen's Counsel in England.
He is the British Honorary Consul since 1998, the first person to be appointed so in Malawi. He was awarded the Order of the British Empire by Her Majesty Queen Elizabeth II in 2003.

Early life 
Savjani was born in Jamnagar, India. According to personal testimony, Savjani's father, Haridas Manji Savjani, came to Malawi in 1933 at the age of 16. He started his own business just before the Second World War and succeeded in importing goods during wartime when shipping was at risk. He went to India at the end of the Second World War to get married. Krishna Savjani came to Malawi as a nine-month-old baby. 

He attended Sir Robert Armitage High School in Limbe where, according to personal testimony, he arranged for the school to invite eminent politicians like Kanyama Chiume and Henry Chipembere to come and debate.

Legal career 
Krishna Savjani was called to the Bar at Gray's Inn in July 1969. In 1978, he established the law firm Savjani & Co.  He was appointed Senior Consul, an appointment made by the President of Malawi.  Senior Counsel is the equivalent of Queen's Counsel in England.

Advisory Committee on Appointment of Senior Counsel 

Savjani is a member of the four-person Advisory Committee (comprising the Chief Justice, the Attorney General, the President of the Malawi Law Society and Mr. Savjani) on the appointment of Senior Counsel. Mr. Savjani became its member in July 1999 when it was established. He was involved in the drafting of its rules.

Honorary Legal Appointment 

Krishna Savjani has been Honorary Legal Adviser to the British High Commissioner in Malawi since 1994.

Malawi Stock Exchange 
Krishna Savjani acted as Chairman of the Malawi Stock Exchange from 2000 to 2010.  Initially involved in the working committee to consider the need for a stock exchange, Krishna Savjani subsequently played an active role in drawing the listing rules.   He was also previously Chairman of the Listing Committee.

Mwanza Accident Commission of Inquiry
Krishna Savjani was one of the members of the Presidential Commission of Inquiry, in 1994, into the so-called Mwanza Motor accident resulting in the death of three senior Cabinet ministers and one Member of Parliament in 1982: Dick Matenje, Twaibu Sangala, Aaron Gadama, and David Chiwanga. The Commission was appointed soon after the fall of Kamuzu Banda when Malawi changed from a one party state to a multiparty state.

Other activities 
Mr. Savjani has acted as spokesman for the Asian community in Malawi from 1971.

Honours 
 He was awarded Order of the British Empire by Queen Elizabeth II in 2003.

See also 

 Henry Masauko Chipembere
 Kanyama Chiume
 Malawi Stock Exchange

References

Literature 

 B, Pachai, Malawi, past and present. (Blantyre: CLAIM, 1972).
 B, Pachai, Malawi: the history of the nation. (London: Longman, 1973).
 B, Pachai, (Ed) The early history of Malawi, (London: Longman, 1973).
 D.D Phiri, History of Malawi. (Blantyre: CLAIM, 2004)
 D.D Phiri, History of Malawi. Vol. 2 (Blantyre: College Publishing Company, 2010)
 O, Kalinga and C, Crosby, Historical Dictionary of Malawi, 3rd ed. (Maryland: Scarecrow Press, 2001)

External links 

 https://web.archive.org/web/20140515024900/http://www.chambersandpartners.com/person/31290/2
 http://www.africalegalnetwork.com/pareas/capital-markets-3/
 http://www.european-times.com/sector/finance-consulting/savjani-co/

1947 births
Living people
Malawian diplomats
20th-century Malawian lawyers
Officers of the Order of the British Empire
Members of Gray's Inn
People from Jamnagar
21st-century Malawian lawyers